Benjamin W. Navarro (born 1962/1963) is an American billionaire businessman, the founder and chief executive officer (CEO) of Sherman Financial Group, LLC, which owns Credit One Bank.

Early life
He is one of eight children of Frank Navarro, a college football coach who posed for the Norman Rockwell painting The Recruit. He was born in Williamstown, Massachusetts, when his father was football coach at Williams College.

He grew up in Westerly and Chariho, Rhode Island. He lived in Princeton, New Jersey and graduated from Princeton High School, when his father was coaching the Princeton University football team.

Navarro earned a bachelor's degree in finance from the University of Rhode Island.

Career
Navarro worked for Goldman Sachs for three years, before joining Citigroup in 1988, rising to vice president and co-head of mortgage sales and trading.

He left Citigroup in 1997, and in 1998 founded Sherman Financial Group, a global diversified investment services company. In 2005, Sherman bought a small bank and renamed it Credit One Bank.

Credit One Bank, based in Las Vegas, Nevada, is a technology and data-driven financial services company focused on distressed or otherwise subprime borrowers. Credit One is one of the top 10 largest Visa credit card issuers in the United States with over 12 million cardholders across the country.  Despite Credit One's large portfolio, the company's reputation is mixed. In 2018, Credit One was named the "Philanthropic Business of the Year - Private" by Vegas Inc. for its philanthropic efforts in Affordable Housing & Homelessness, Employment Services, and Financial Education. However, in J.D. Power's credit card satisfaction survey Credit One ranked last among national card issues in 2021, a title the bank has held every year since joining the survey in 2017. Credit One faces exceptional criticism from the Better Business Bureau regarding its billing and collections practices, and often reports incorrect data to credit reporting agencies. Multiple industry reviewers have raised concerns of (potentially) predatory business practices, mainly focused on Credit One’s exorbitant fees and lack of transparency.

In 2021, Navarro founded Beemok Hospitality Collection, a hospitality company consisting of hotel, restaurant, and entertainment properties throughout the Southeast. The collection originated in October 2021 with the acquisition of their flagship property, the Charleston Place - the largest hotel in Charleston at 434 rooms. Other notable properties in the collection include The Cooper, a 225-room luxury hotel being developed along downtown Charleston’s waterfront; The Riviera Theater, a registered historic landmark Art Deco theater in downtown Charleston; and Hotel Domestique, a luxury hotel in Traveler’s Rest, South Carolina.

In 2022, Navarro bought the Western & Southern Open, a joint men's and women's tennis tournament on the ATP and WTA tour.

Navarro has an estimated net worth of about $3 billion.

Sports interests
Navarro owns the Live To Play Tennis Club in Mount Pleasant, South Carolina, which has hosted three USTA national junior tennis championships, and six International Tennis Federation women's pro circuit tournaments.

In 2018, he was a bidder for the Carolina Panthers NFL sports franchise. He ultimately lost to David Tepper.

In September 2018, he bought Charleston Tennis LLC, owners of the Charleston Open women's tennis event, through his company Beemok Sports LLC.

In 2022, Navarro funded extensive renovations to Credit One Stadium, a 20-year-old city-owned facility, as a gift to the City of Charleston. The newly-renovated stadium debuted on April 2, 2022 for the 50th annual Credit One Charleston Open, the largest women's only tennis event in North America.

Personal life
He is married to Kelly Navarro, they have four children and live in Charleston, South Carolina.

His daughters, Emma and Meggie Navarro, are involved in tennis. Emma is a collegiate tennis player at the University of Virginia. She has a career high WTA singles ranking of 194 achieved on March 21, 2022 and won the NCAA division 1 women's singles title on May 28, 2021 as a freshman. Meggie is committed to play collegiately at UVA.

Philanthropy
Navarro's philanthropic ventures are focused on education and mental wellness. In 2008, he founded Meeting Street Schools, a South Carolina-based network of one private and three public elementary and middle schools serving an entirely under-resourced demographic. Meeting Street Schools were founded upon the belief that all children deserve an excellent education regardless of their geographic or socioeconomic circumstances and now serve over 1,800 students.

In December 2020, Navarro announced the Meeting Street Scholarship Fund wherein he pledged to supplement the cost of higher education for any Charleston County high school students who also qualified for the Pell grant and the State's LIFE scholarship, ensuring college opportunities for hundreds of South Carolina high school graduates each year.

In 2020, Navarro, in partnership with the Medical University of South Carolina, founded Modern Minds, a new type of mental wellness center that uses holistic health strategies to help adults living with anxiety or depression.

References

1960s births
Living people
Businesspeople from Charleston, South Carolina
University of Rhode Island alumni
Goldman Sachs people
Citigroup people
American billionaires
American chief executives of financial services companies
American company founders
People from Princeton, New Jersey
People from Williamstown, Massachusetts
Princeton High School (New Jersey) alumni